This is an incomplete list of people who have been created honorary Knights or Dames by the British crown, as well as those who have been raised to the two comparable Orders of Chivalry (Order of Merit and Order of the Companions of Honour) and the Royal Victorian Chain, which do not carry pre-nominal styles.

Use of pre-nominal styles and post-nominal initials. An honorary award is one made to a person who is not a citizen of a Commonwealth realm. He or she cannot use the pre-nominal style of 'Sir' or 'Dame', but can use the post-nominal letters (after their names), subject to the prevailing conventions in his or her own country. If such a person later acquires citizenship of a Commonwealth realm, then any honorary awards usually become substantive, and in the case of knights and dames they can begin to use the pre-nominal styles. However this is not automatic. The person must be dubbed by the King or his delegate in order to be entitled to use the pre-nominal style. If the knighthood is in an order which has a special class for honorary knighthoods, a change to a regular class of knighthoods is also required.

Loss of citizenship of a British realm. Citizens of a country which was a full part of the British Empire or Commonwealth when they received the honour (i.e. who were British subjects at the time), were substantive knights or dames, not honorary. The knighthood does not become honorary, and the person may choose to use his or her title(s), after their country becomes a republic. Citizens of British protectorates and mandated territories usually received honorary awards. Notable exceptions were rulers of the Indian princely states and their subjects, who were de jure British protected persons and not British subjects, but who received substantive knighthoods.

Annulment and restoration. In certain circumstances, an honorary award may be annulled (i.e. revoked). The effect is that, officially, the person is considered never to have been given the award, their name is erased from the order's register, and they are required to return all insignia. This happens when the Sovereign issues a signed and sealed ordinance cancelling and annulling the appointment. This is not common and in practice only occurs where the recipient has engaged in serious detrimental activities, e.g. following a conviction for serious crimes, or for hostile acts against the United Kingdom. In rare circumstances, an annulled award may later be restored by the Sovereign. Details of known annulments and restorations are annotated in the table below.

Order of the Garter terminology. The Order of the Garter uses terminology different from that of most other British orders. 'Extra Knights Companion of the Garter' and 'Extra Ladies of the Order of the Garter' are the equivalent of 'Honorary Knights' and 'Honorary Dames' in other orders. As with other orders, the pre-nominal styles 'Sir' and 'Lady' are not used by Extra Knights and Extra Ladies. Revoked appointments are said to be 'degraded' rather than 'annulled'; the effect, however, is the same.

Arts and entertainment

Politics and government

Diplomatic

Military

Business

Religion

European royalty

Asian, African and Oceanian royalty

Professional, humanitarian and exploration

Sport

Abbreviations
The following are listed in order of precedence:

Notes

Footnotes 

Lists of award winners
 
British honours system
United Kingdom-related lists
Lists of knights and dames